Terpyllus or Terpyllos was a town of Mygdonia in ancient Macedonia. The name has also come down to us in the form of Trepillus.

The site of Terpyllus is unlocated, although a village in the former municipality of Kroussa has revived the name.

References

Populated places in ancient Macedonia
Former populated places in Greece
Geography of ancient Mygdonia
Lost ancient cities and towns